Byelaazyorsk or Beloozersk is a city in Brest Region, Belarus.

Cities in Belarus
Populated places in Brest Region
Byaroza District
Grodno Governorate
Polesie Voivodeship